The Highwayman is an Australian musical comedy with book, music and lyrics by Edmond Samuels. Set in Bendigo during the Gold Rush in the 1860s, the story concerns the love of an innkeeper's daughter for a highwayman.

The Highwayman premiered at the King's Theatre in Melbourne in November 1950. It played a Sydney season at the Palace Theatre from March 1951.

Songs featured in the 1965 TV special Lola and the Highwayman.

References

Australian musicals
1950 musicals